Takamine (高峰 or 高嶺) is a Japanese family name, translated literally as high ridge or high peak. It may refer to:

Company
Takamine Guitars, Japanese acoustic guitar manufacturer founded in 1962 and based in Nakatsugawa, Japan.

Locations
Mount Takamine, a mountain in Japan.

People
Gō Takamine (1948-), Japanese film director
Hideko Takamine (1924-2010), Japanese film actress
Takamine Hideo (1854-1910), Japanese educator 
Jōkichi Takamine (1854-1922), Japanese chemist
Takamine Tokumei (1653-1738), Japanese surgeon
Takamine Toshio (1885–1959), Japanese physicist

Fictional characters
Kiyo Takamine (Kiyomaro Takamine), Seitaro Takamine, and Hana Takamine, Zatch Bell! (Konjiki no Gash!!)
Tsukasa Takamine of Sasami: Mahou Shoujo Club

Noa Takamine from The Idolmaster Cinderella Girls: Starlight StageSee also
Epinephrine, by trade name Takamine''

Japanese-language surnames